was a Japanese actress and voice actress who worked for 81 Produce. She was the wife of fellow voice actor Hōchū Ōtsuka.

On November 1, 2014, she died of sepsis at the age of 67.

Filmography

Anime
Little Lord Fauntleroy (Mrs. Cordette)
Ace wo Nerae!/Shin Ace wo Nerae! (Ranko Midorikawa)
Armored Trooper Votoms (Fyana)
Ashita e Attack (Kyoko)
Bavi Stock (Roose Mirar)
Bremen 4: Angels in Hell (movie) (Rondo)
Crusher Joe (movie) (Norma)
Cutey Honey (Coral Claw, Crocodile Claw, Great Claw)
Daimos (Raiza)
Dream Hunter Rem (Tokiko)
Final Fantasy: Unlimited (Lisa's Mother)
Fist of the North Star (Patra)
Gosick (The Orphan)
Harlock Saga (Meeme)
His and Her Circumstances (Eiko Arima (ep.18))
Iczer Reborn (OVA) (Bigro)
InuYasha (The Mask of Flesh)
Kizuoibito (OVA) (Peggy)
Lupin III: Part II (Anita (ep.31), Kira (ep.46), Nova (ep.114))
Lupin III: Part III (Anita (ep.41))
Mirmo! (Teacher)
Monster (Margott Langer (Fake))
Pokémon (Kaneyo)
The Super Dimension Century Orguss (Marian)
Vampire Hunter D (OVA) (Older Snake Sister)
Vampire Princess Miyu (Ohshima's wife (ep.3))
Yu Yu Hakusho (Kuroko Sanada)
Zone of the Enders (Melinda Gargoyle)

Miscellaneous
Kidou Keiji Jiban (Madogarbo)
Chikyuu Sentai Fiveman (Wandering Swordsman Queen Killer)

Video games
Night Trap (Japanese Version) Sheila Martin

Dubbing roles

Live-action
Sigourney Weaver
Aliens (1993 TV Asashi edition) (Ellen Ripley)
Gorillas in the Mist (1993 TV Asashi edition) (Dian Fossey)
Working Girl (1991 TV Asashi edition) (Katharine Parker)
Dave (Ellen Mitchell)
Copycat (1998 TV Tokyo edition) (Helen Hudson)
A Map of the World (Alice Goodwin)
Heartbreakers (Max Conners)
Baby Mama (Chaffee Bicknell)
Avatar (Dr. Grace Augustine)
Cedar Rapids (Macy Vanderhei)
Paul ("The Big Guy")
The Cabin in the Woods (The Director)
Susan Sarandon
The Hunger (Dr. Sarah Roberts)
The Client (1997 TV Asashi edition) (Regina "Reggie" Love)
Safe Passage (Margaret "Mag" Singer)
Earthly Possessions (Charlotte Emory)
Noel (Rose Harrison)
Shall We Dance? (Beverly Clark)
Jamie Lee Curtis
My Girl (Shelly DeVoto)
Forever Young (Claire Cooper)
My Girl 2 (Shelly DeVoto)
Virus (2002 NTV edition) (Kelly "Kit" Foster)
Halloween: Resurrection (Laurie Strode)
2010 (1988 TV Asashi edition) (Tanya Kirbuk (Helen Mirren))
50/50 (Diane Lerner (Anjelica Huston))
Absolute Power (Gloria Russell (Judy Davis))
Albino Alligator (Janet Boudreaux (Faye Dunaway))
Blood Work (Dr. Bonnie Fox (Anjelica Huston))
Bringing Down the House (Kate Sanderson (Jean Smart))
Cagney & Lacey (Det. Mary Beth Lacey (Tyne Daly))
Casper (Catherine "Carrigan" Crittenden (Cathy Moriarty))
Choke (Ida Mancini (Anjelica Huston))
Clear and Present Danger (Dr. Caroline "Cathy" Ryan (Anne Archer))
Consenting Adults (Priscilla Parker (Mary Elizabeth Mastrantonio))
Creepshow 2 (Annie Lansing (Lois Chiles))
Daddy Long Legs (1977 TV Tokyo edition) (Julie Andre (Leslie Caron))
Death Wish 3 (Kathryn Davis (Deborah Raffin))
Die Hard (1990 TV Asashi edition) (Holly Gennaro-McClane (Bonnie Bedelia))
Die Hard 2 (1994 TV Asashi edition) (Holly Gennaro-McClane (Bonnie Bedelia))
Doubt (Sister Aloysius Beauvier (Meryl Streep))
Final Analysis (Heather Evans (Kim Basinger))
Friends (Nora Tyler Bing (Morgan Fairchild))
The Godfather Part II (1980 NTV edition (Deanna Corleone (Marianna Hill))
Harry Potter and the Prisoner of Azkaban (Madam Rosmerta (Julie Christie))
The Hunter (1982 Fuji TV edition) (Dotty (Kathryn Harrold))
Ignition (Judge Faith Mattis (Lena Olin))
In the Line of Fire (Lilly Raines (Rene Russo))
Inkheart (Elinor Loredan (Helen Mirren))
Internal Affairs (Sergeant Amy Wallace (Laurie Metcalf))
The Invisible Circus (Gail O'Connor (Blythe Danner))
Jackie Brown (Jackie Brown (Pam Grier))
Jurassic Park (Dr. Ellie Sattler (Laura Dern))
Kindergarten Cop (Detective Phoebe O'Hara (Pamela Reed))
A Life Less Ordinary (O'Reilly (Holly Hunter))
The Lucky One (Ellie (Blythe Danner))
Max Headroom (Theora Jones (Amanda Pays))
Miami Vice (Gina Navarro Calabrese (Saundra Santiago))
The Mirror Has Two Faces (Rose Morgan (Barbra Streisand))
Never Let Me Go (Miss Emily (Charlotte Rampling))
Nick of Time (Eleanor Grant (Marsha Mason))
October Sky (Miss Freida J. Riley (Laura Dern))
On Her Majesty's Secret Service (1979 TBS edition) (Nancy (Catherine Schell))
Patriot Games (Cathy Ryan (Anne Archer))
Presumed Innocent (1995 TV Asashi edition (Barbara Sabich (Bonnie Bedelia))
Regarding Henry (Sarah Turner (Annette Bening))
Remo Williams: The Adventure Begins (Major Rayner Fleming (Kate Mulgrew))
The Rose (Mary Rose Foster (Bette Midler))
Sneakers (Liz (Mary McDonnell))
Spaceballs (1993 TBS edition) (Commanderette Zircon (Leslie Bevis))
Superman IV: The Quest for Peace (Lois Lane (Margot Kidder))
The Temp (Charlene Towne (Faye Dunaway))
They Live (1990 TV Asahi edition) (Holly Thompson (Meg Foster))
Tucker: The Man and His Dream (Vera Tucker (Joan Allen))
The Verdict (1985 TBS edition) (Laura Fischer (Charlotte Rampling))
West Side Story (1979 TBS edition) (Graziella (Gina Trikonis))
Wild Things (Sandra Van Ryan (Theresa Russell))
The Yards (Kitty Olchin (Faye Dunaway))

Animation
The Ant Bully (The Queen Ant)
Terrahawks (Captain Mary Falconer)

References

External links
Official agency profile 

1947 births
2014 deaths
Voice actresses from Fukuoka Prefecture
Japanese video game actresses
Japanese voice actresses
81 Produce voice actors
20th-century Japanese actresses
21st-century Japanese actresses